Thomas Cyril Mason (July 8, 1939 – January 22, 2015) was an American football running back in the National Football League (NFL).

College career
Mason played college football for Tulane University.

1959: 10 Games – 81 carries for 336 yards. 5 catches for 54 yards and 2 TD.
1960: 10 Games – 120 carries for 663 yards. 28 catches for 376 yards and 5 TD.

Professional career
Mason was selected first overall by the expansion Minnesota Vikings in the 1961 NFL Draft. In six seasons with the Vikings, he rushed for 3,252 yards and scored 28 touchdowns. In 1967 NFL season, he was signed by the Los Angeles Rams. He played with the Rams for four years, but accumulated only four touchdowns and less than 900 yards. He finished his career with the Washington Redskins in 1971. He did not officially announce his retirement until June 8, 1973.

Records
Mason ranks ninth in total rushing yards and ninth in rushing touchdowns for the Minnesota Vikings.

Personal life
Mason was married to Rita Ridinger in the mid 1960s.  He married gymnast Cathy Rigby in 1972.  They were divorced in 1981. Mason married Louise England in 1987, they divorced in 1994. He married Karen Kay Mason, in 1999. He was a 1976 graduate of the Western State College of Law. He died in hospice care at Newport Beach, California on January 22, 2015.

References

External links
 Profile, pro-football-reference.com; accessed January 26, 2015.

1939 births
2015 deaths
American football running backs
Los Angeles Rams players
Minnesota Vikings players
National Football League announcers
National Football League first-overall draft picks
Sportspeople from Lake Charles, Louisiana
Players of American football from Louisiana
San Diego Chargers announcers
Tulane Green Wave football players
Washington Redskins players
Western Conference Pro Bowl players